Dichocrocis punctilinealis is a moth in the family Crambidae. It was described by George Hampson in 1899. It is found in Indonesia, where it has been recorded from the Tanimbar Islands.

References

Moths described in 1899
Spilomelinae